SIEL may refer to:

 Societa Industrie Elettroniche (SIEL), an Italian company that made electronic organs and synthesizers in the 1980s
 Honda Siel Cars India
 , a system that provides the waiting time until the arrival of the next two Paris Métro trains
  (Sovereignty, Identity and Freedoms), a French political party and part of the Rassemblement bleu Marine coalition
 Standard individual export licence which permits a specific list of goods to be exported to a specific destination.